Just You and I may refer to:
"Just You and I" (Namie Amuro song), 2017
"Just You and I" (Tom Walker song), 2017